

Bilal may refer to:

People
 Bilal (name) (a list of people with the name)
 Bilal ibn Rabah, a companion of Muhammad
 Bilal (American singer)
 Bilal (Lebanese singer)

Places
Bilal Colony, a neighbourhood of Korangi Town in Karachi, Sindh, Pakistan
Bilal Town, a suburb of Abbottabad, Pakistan where Osama bin Laden was killed

Other uses
Bilal: A New Breed of Hero, a 2015 animated film
23166 Bilal, main belt asteroid
Bilal Muslim Mission, international Shi'a twelver organization
Bilal Xhaferri Publishing House, Albanian publishing house

See also
Bilel or Billel, a given name
Bilali, usually a surname